
Grove Hinman Loomis or G.H. Loomis (1823-1898) was a photographer in Boston, Massachusetts, in the mid-19th century. He also worked as a real estate broker, teacher and government employee. He died in Newton, Massachusetts in 1898.

Images

References

Further reading
 G.H Loomis. Focal Points. International annual of Anthony's photographic bulletin, 1888
 G.H. Loomis. "My Resitters."  Anthony's Photographic Bulletin, April 1890

External links

  (includes info related to Loomis)
 New York Public Library. Portrait of Major-General Benjamin F. Butler, U.S.A., engraving after photo by Loomis
 Flickr. Carte de visite by G.H. Loomis
 Flickr. Carte de visite of soldier by G.H. Loomis
 Flickr. Woman reading
 Massachusetts Historical Society. Charles W. Jenks Carte de Visite Collection. Includes work by Loomis
 

American portrait photographers
1823 births
1898 deaths
Artists from Newton, Massachusetts
19th century in Boston
19th-century American photographers